The Mauritius Qualifications Authority (MQA) is the government organisation responsible for setting educational standards and accrediting qualifications.

Its head office is in Vacoas-Phoenix.

National Qualifications Framework

The National Qualifications Framework (NQF) in Mauritius is the framework for setting educational standards of academic and vocational qualifications as well as for categorising qualifications by level and stage of education. The NQF is established and maintained by the Mauritius Qualifications Authority. The framework may be mapped to qualification frameworks of other countries.

Levels

References

Education in Mauritius